Sweden participated at the 2018 Summer Youth Olympics in Buenos Aires from 6 to 18 October 2018. 18 athletes will compete for the country at the games.

Medalists

Medalists in mixed NOCs events

Badminton

Sweden qualified one player based on the Badminton Junior World Rankings. 

Singles

Team

Beach volleyball

Sweden qualified a boys' team based on their performance at 2017-18 European Youth Continental Cup Final.

Golf

Individual

Team

Gymnastics

Artistic
Sweden qualified two gymnasts based on its performance at the 2018 European Junior Championship.

Boys

Girls

Multi-discipline

Rowing

Sweden qualified one boat based on its performance at the 2017 World Rowing Junior Championships.

Swimming

Sweden is eligible to send a total of eight swimmers to the games after finishing among the top sixteen teams at the 2017 World Aquatics Championships.

Boys

Girls

Mixed

Table tennis

Singles

Team

Taekwondo

Girls

Triathlon

Sweden qualified one athlete based on its performance at the 2018 European Youth Olympic Games Qualifier.

Individual

Relay

Wrestling

Girls' freestyle

References

2018 in Swedish sport
Nations at the 2018 Summer Youth Olympics
Sweden at the Youth Olympics